Tracy Tormé (born April 12, 1959) is an American screenwriter and television producer, known for his work on the science fiction series Sliders and Star Trek: The Next Generation, and the film Fire in the Sky.

Early life 
Tormé was born on April 12, 1959, in Los Angeles, California to Arlene Miles and singer Mel Tormé.

Career
In the early 1980s, Tormé was a writer for Saturday Night Live.

In the late 1980s, he was a story editor and writer in the first season of Star Trek: The Next Generation, but left early in the second season over creative differences.

In 1991 with Barry Oringer, Tormé wrote the screenplay for the miniseries Intruders which ran on CBS in May 1992. Intruders was based on the book of the same name by Budd Hopkins.

Tormé wrote the screenplay for the 1993 film Fire in the Sky based on Travis Walton's book The Walton Experience.

With Robert K. Weiss he co-created the television series Sliders, which ran 1995–2000.

Other series he has written for include Odyssey 5 and Carnivàle.

Accolades
Tormé was nominated for the 1993 Saturn Award for Best Writing for his screenplay on the film Fire in the Sky.

Personal life
Tormé has siblings Steve, Melissa, Daisy, and James Tormé, and step-siblings Carrie Tormé and Kurt Goldsmith.

References

Bibliography
 Linaweaver, Brad; Sliders: The Classic Episodes. 1998. TV Books. New York. . Pages 274–75.

External links

 Transcript of speech by Tormé

1959 births
Television producers from California
American male screenwriters
American people of Russian-Jewish descent
American people of Belarusian-Jewish descent
Living people
Writers from Los Angeles
Screenwriters from California